The idea of national treasure, like national epics and national anthems, is part of the language of romantic nationalism, which arose in the late 18th century and 19th centuries. Nationalism is an ideology that supports the nation as the fundamental unit of human social life, which includes shared language, values, and culture. Thus national treasure, part of the ideology of nationalism, is shared culture.

A national treasure can be a shared cultural asset, which may or may not have monetary value; for example, a skilled banjo player would be a Living National Treasure. Or it may refer to a rare cultural object, such as the medieval manuscript Plan of St. Gall in Switzerland. The government of Japan designates the most famous of the nation's cultural properties as National Treasures of Japan. The National Treasures of Korea are a set of artifacts, sites, and buildings that are recognised by South Korea as having exceptional cultural value.

Notable examples
There are thousands of national treasures around the world. Listed here are samples of the different types of things that can be national treasure:

People
Examples of people who have been described as national treasures include the following:
 Certain countries officially designate individuals or groups as Living National Treasures. See, for example, Living National Treasures of Japan and National Living Treasures of the Philippines
 Comedian, actor, author and director Stephen Fry, broadcaster and naturalist Sir David Attenborough, and racing driver Stirling Moss have in several high-brow non-industry-specific publications been referred to as national treasures of the United Kingdom.
 Tame Iti, a Tūhoe activist, artist and rangatira who formed Ngā Tamatoa, is considered a national treasure of New Zealand.
 Mícheál Ó Muircheartaigh, the voice of Gaelic games, has been described both as a "national treasure" and "Ireland's greatest national treasure", often with reference to the tendency in the neighbouring United Kingdom to declare such people as this.
 After the Brazil national football team won the 1962 FIFA World Cup, wealthy European clubs offered massive fees to sign their young star player, Pelé, but the government of Brazil declared him an official national treasure to prevent him from being transferred out of the country.
 The late German humorist Vicco von Bülow alias Loriot had the status of a national treasure in Germany.

In 2013 the British satirical magazine Private Eye began running a column poking fun at an exponential increase in references in the press to "national treasures".

Places
 Namdaemun in South Korea.
 Grand Canyon in the United States of America.
 Lethbridge Viaduct in the Lethbridge, Alberta, Canada.

Cultural artifacts

 The Fairy Queen locomotive in India.
 The Declaration of Independence, Constitution, and Bill of Rights for the United States.
 Stonehenge and Magna Carta in the United Kingdom. The National Treasure for Public Life is called The Magna Carta Award.
 Chinese bronze tripod cauldrons (ding) dating back to the Shang Dynasty (1600-1046 BCE)
 Moon rocks collected during NASA's 1969-1972 Apollo missions
 The Book of Kells in Ireland

Geographic features
 The Constitution of Greece of 2001 declared that the Greek coastline is a national treasure (see Patras).
 The United States natural and cultural resources that collectively comprise the National Park System are considered to be a national treasure.

Music
 In 1997, the United States Library of Congress recognized the song "Truckin'" by the rock band Grateful Dead as a national treasure of the United States.
 Andy Williams's voice was described as a national treasure by U.S. President Ronald Reagan.

Animal

 Bald eagle in United States
 Panda in China
 Raja elephant of Sri Lanka

See also 
 Monument
 List of Chinese cultural relics forbidden to be exhibited abroad
 National Treasures of Japan
 National Treasures of North Korea
 National Treasures of South Korea
 National Treasures of Taiwan
 National Treasures of Vietnam
 World Heritage Site

References

External links 

Cultural heritage